The decisional Diffie–Hellman (DDH) assumption is a computational hardness assumption about a certain problem involving discrete logarithms in cyclic groups. It is used as the basis to prove the security of many cryptographic protocols, most notably the ElGamal and Cramer–Shoup cryptosystems.

Definition

Consider a (multiplicative) cyclic group  of order , and with generator .

This intuitive notion can be formally stated by saying that the following two probability distributions are computationally indistinguishable (in the security parameter):

Triples of the first kind are often called DDH triplet or DDH tuples.

Relation to other assumptions

The DDH assumption is related to the discrete log assumption.

DDH is considered to be a stronger assumption than the discrete logarithm assumption, because there are groups for which computing discrete logs is believed to be hard (And thus the DL Assumption is believed to be true), but detecting DDH tuples is easy (And thus DDH is false). Because of this, requiring that the DDH assumption holds in a group is believed to be a more restrictive requirement than DL.

The DDH assumption is also related to the computational Diffie–Hellman assumption (CDH). DDH is considered to be a stronger assumption than CDH because if CDH is solved, which means we can get , the answer to DDH will become obvious.

Other properties

The problem of detecting DDH tuples is random self-reducible, meaning, roughly, that if it is hard for even a small fraction of inputs, it is hard for almost all inputs; if it is easy for even a small fraction of inputs, it is easy for almost all inputs.

Groups for which DDH is assumed to hold

When using a cryptographic protocol whose security depends on the DDH assumption, it is important that the protocol is implemented using groups where DDH is believed to hold:

 The subgroup of th residues modulo a prime , where  is also a large prime (also called a Schnorr group).
 A prime-order elliptic curve  over the field , where  is prime, provided  has large embedding degree.
 A Jacobian of a hyper-elliptic curve over the field  with a prime number of reduced divisors, where  is prime, provided the Jacobian has large embedding degree.

Importantly, the DDH assumption does not hold in the multiplicative group , where  is prime.

If the embedding degree is large (say around the size of ) then the DDH assumption will still hold because the pairing cannot be computed. Even if the embedding degree is small, there are some subgroups of the curve in which the DDH assumption is believed to hold.

See also
 Diffie–Hellman problem
 Diffie–Hellman key exchange
 Computational hardness assumptions
 XDH assumption
 Decisional Linear assumption

References

Computational hardness assumptions
Elliptic curve cryptography